Dzham (real name Kirill, January 27, 1986) – an artist who began his musical career in hip hop, and later gradually gone over to the club theme, becoming an artist in the genre of Mash Up Hip-Hop and Dance in Russia. He managed to release four albums in his native tongue.

Biography
In the beginning of 2009 Dzham acquainted with Fredro Starr, the frontman of the hip hop group Onyx. During their Russian tour they record the song together "Say What" and the same day make the video clip in St.Peterburg. Afterwards signed contracts with TOCO International NL and Radikal Records US. He becomes the only Russian artist in the genre of hip hop, which has contracts with international labels.

At the end of 2009th in Philadelphia Dzham became acquainted with the musician and producer Jim Beanz, author of the winning song of Eurovision 2008 Dima Bilan ("Believe Me"). They worked together to create a track called "Every Day", which received extensive airplay on Russian music television channels and radio stations.

In 2009 while in London Dzham made experiments with dance music. He collaborated on recording of the song "Red Handed" with the British rapper Sway DaSafo. The song soon received appreciation at MIDEM 2010. Later Dzham presented the track "Slow Down" with the British music star DJ Ironik

In 2010 Dzham recorded mixtape with American hip hop DJ DJ Whoo Kid (G Unit, Shadyville), which represented all the tracks recorded over the past year, including the lead single, self-explanatory track entitled “I’m From Russia”, with a video clip

In  2011 Dzham released his new video for the track "I Like It", featuring singer and musician David Todua moving further away from the hip hop tendency.
The music video "I Like It" was filmed in one take in a London club by British video director Dan Ruttley, who has accomplished projects for Paul McCartney, Led Zeppelin, James Brown, Take That, as well as for artists of the UK hip hop scene such as Sway and Chipmunk.

In his free time from studio work Dzham is touring in Russia as well as in New York, London, Paris, Düsseldorf, Tallinn.

Discography
 Dzham & Dj Whoo Kid - Im From Russia (2010)
 Dzham – Once and for all (2008) 
 Dzham – Dzham the Leader! (2008)
 Dzham – Real Predator (2007)

Videography
 Dzham ft. David Todua - I Like It (2011)
 Dzham – Im From Russia (2010)
 Dzham ft. Sway – RedHanded (2010)
 Dzham – Get It Girl (2009)
 Dzham – Every Day (2009)
 Dzham - Bossi Babosi (2009)
 Dzham ft Onyx - Say What (2009)

References

External links

 Official website
 Twitter

Russian hip hop
Russian hip hop musicians
Russian pop musicians
Living people
1986 births
People from Smolensk